Monzernheim is an Ortsgemeinde – a municipality belonging to a Verbandsgemeinde, a kind of collective municipality – in the Alzey-Worms district in Rhineland-Palatinate, Germany.

History
Monzernheim is mentioned in the Wormser wall-building ordinance from around 900 as one of the places that shared responsibility for maintaining the city wall of Worms.

Geography

Location 
As a winegrowing centre, Monzernheim lies in Germany's biggest winegrowing district, in the middle of Rhenish Hesse. It belongs to the Verbandsgemeinde of Wonnegau, whose seat is in Osthofen.

Politics

Municipal council 
The council is made up of 12 council members, who were elected by majority vote at the municipal election held on 7 June 2009, and the honorary mayor as chairman.

Coat of arms 
The municipality's arms might be described thus: Per fess sable a demi-lion rampant Or armed, langued and crowned gules, and argent a bunch of grapes palewise leafed of two and couped vert.

References

External links 
 

Alzey-Worms